The Natchez Bluffs and Under-the-Hill Historic District is a  historic district that was listed on the U.S. National Register of Historic Places in 1972.  It is roughly bounded by S. Canal St., Broadway, and the Mississippi River.

The "Under-the-Hill" area once contained all of Natchez, i.e. about 20 buildings at the time of the American Revolutionary War.  Gradually houses were built on the bluffs above, an "Upper Town" emerged, and eventually the center of Natchez shifted.

The district's primary historic assets are the Natchez landing site ("Under the Hill") and, on the bluff above, a city park area which includes the site of the second French Fort Rosalie, built during 1730–34.  The landing site area was where the Natchez Trace began.  The area was frequented by gamblers, river pirates, highwaymen, and prostitutes and was described, in 1810, as a place such that "'...for the size of it, there is not, perhaps in the world, a more dissipated spot.'"  The fort was renamed Fort Panmure by the British after they took possession following the 1756-1763 Seven Years' War, then later fell into ruin.  In 1971, the district area included six "dilapidated" brick buildings on Silver Street of uncertain age.

The Fort Rosalie portion of the district is included in the Natchez National Historical Park.

A map delineating the district appears on page 15 in its NRHP nomination document.

References

External links 

Historic districts in Natchez, Mississippi
Historic districts on the National Register of Historic Places in Mississippi
National Register of Historic Places in Natchez, Mississippi